Baday is a village in Usolsky District of Irkutsk Oblast, Russia. It is situated on the Bolshaya Belaya River.

Rural localities in Irkutsk Oblast